Exaireta spinigera, known generally as the garden soldier fly or blue soldier fly, is a species of soldier fly in the family Stratiomyidae. It is native to Australia; however, it has been introduced to countries and islands such as New Zealand, Belgium and Hawaii.

References

Stratiomyidae
Insects described in 1830
Taxa named by Christian Rudolph Wilhelm Wiedemann
Diptera of Australasia